Sparattanthelium is a genus of flowering plants belonging to the family Hernandiaceae.

Its native range is Southern Mexico to Southern Tropical America.

Species
Species:

Sparattanthelium acreanum 
Sparattanthelium amazonum 
Sparattanthelium aruakorum 
Sparattanthelium borororum 
Sparattanthelium botocudorum 
Sparattanthelium burchellii 
Sparattanthelium glabrum 
Sparattanthelium guianense 
Sparattanthelium tarapotanum 
Sparattanthelium tupiniquinorum 
Sparattanthelium wonotoboense

References

Hernandiaceae
Laurales genera